Avient Aviation was an international cargo airline with its head office in Harare, Zimbabwe and its commercial center in the United Kingdom. The company was established in 1993 and offered scheduled and chartered flights to Africa, South America, Middle East and Far East and the Caspian region. Avient Limited was placed into administration on 5 April 2013, with flight operations taken over by AV Cargo Airlines Limited.

Corporate affairs
The company Avient Aviation had its head office in Harare, Zimbabwe. It had its Continental Europe office on the property of Liège Airport in Grâce-Hollogne, Belgium. It had its United Kingdom office in Global House, Manor Court in Manor Royal, Crawley, West Sussex RH10 9PY. Andrew Smith founded Avient's UK sales office in the United Kingdom office in 2001

Fleet
In 2009, Avient took delivery of an MD-11F

Avient originally planned to replace its DC-10s with A330s, however the company decided that the MD-11F was the more appropriate substitute.

As of December 2010, the Avient Aviation fleet consisted of the following aircraft with an average age of 29.7 years:
Both aircraft are grounded, currently at LGG airport, Belgium 

As of 2013, the DC-10 has been sold, and one MD-11 (Reg.: Z-BVT / CN: 48410) is grounded in Zurich since March 2013 (as of 29 April 2014).

Accidents and incidents

On 28 November 2009, an Avient Aviation McDonnell Douglas MD-11F crashed during its take-off roll at Shanghai Pudong International Airport, resulting in the death of three persons on board and the aircraft being written off.

Current activities
In April 2013, AV Cargo Airlines Limited took over the business of Avient Ltd. after Avient Limited was placed into administration, following losses. Avient SA, the Belgian branch, has been closed.

James Tickell and Carl Faulds at Hampshire, Dorset and London based 'Portland Business & Financial Solutions' were appointed joint administrators.

References

External links 

Official website

Airlines established in 1993
Airlines disestablished in 2013
Defunct cargo airlines
Defunct airlines of Zimbabwe
Cargo airlines of Zimbabwe